COLUMBUS II is an optical, repeatered, transatlantic telephone cable. It entered into commercial service in 1994. The system, along with the Americas cable, was the first to use the Erbium-doped fiber amplifier (EDFA) as its optical amplifier repeaters.

It is in 3 segments has landing points in:
Columbus II - A (1121 km) - 560 MB/s
1. Cancún, Mexico
2. West Palm Beach, Florida, United States
Columbus II - B (2068 km) - 2500 MB/s
2. West Palm Beach, Florida, United States
3. Magens Bay, St. Thomas, U.S. Virgin Islands
Columbus II - C (9116 km) - 560 MB/s
3. Magens Bay, St. Thomas, U.S. Virgin Islands
4. Funchal, Madeira, Portugal
5. Sardina, Gran Canaria, Spain
6. Palermo, Sicily, Italy

See also
Common technical regulation
Communication source

References

ICPC Cable database
Alcatel Website-Cable info
Yahoo factbook

Submarine communications cables in the Mediterranean Sea
Submarine communications cables in the North Atlantic Ocean
Transatlantic communications cables
1994 establishments in Europe
1994 establishments in North America